Unsavoury Products is the fifth full-length studio album by The Black Dog featuring Parisian spoken word artist Black Sifichi. The album was released in 2002 on CD.
It is meant as a tribute to William S. Burroughs and inspired by The Black Dog’s collaboration with Burroughs before his death. Ken Downie explained: "We’d sent tapes to William Burroughs, and were waiting for him to deliver some spoken word back to us, but he fell ill, and died. Mr Sifichi sent us a pair of blue underpants he'd found in Paris, so he was the natural person to help us finish off the album. We got on very well, and had a lot of fun making it."
Black Sifichi remembers: "The Black Dog heard my first album with Negative Stencil 'Tick' and I made contact when I heard about their Burroughs project. I thought I could do a 'cameo' reading of one of Bill's texts somewhere on it. Anyway, The Black Dog loved my voice, how it was delivered. After Bill's death a demo of mine inspired them to produce a homage to Burroughs with me. Unsavoury Products has a message... the majority of traditional electronic albums do not. It is a way to use musical aesthetics and seamlessly merge them with words. In many ways the album is closer to art than most music media/products, which are constrained by commercial demands."
At the time of the album's production the band considered itself a "multimedia collective" with members Martin (in charge of creative design and development), Steve Ash (studio production) and Ross Knight (guitar) besides Ken Downie: "We're essentially a collective in the Warhol 'Factory' sense; we float in and out of the group depending on the projects we're working on, independently or together."

Track listing
 "What Do They Want?" - 2:56
 "Dogbite" - 4:20
 "Secret Biscuits" - 3:49
 "If I Were King" - 3:29
 "B4 the Sky Was Built" - 3:34
 "Dear Ron" - 3:03
 "Invisible Things" - 4:13
 "Let's Talk Music" - 4:25
 "Mental Health Hotline" - 2:07
 "Va Zee" - 1:32
 "Image Poem" - 2:12
 "New York Dorx" - 3:03
 "Someone at the Office" - 3:04
 "Science Tells Us" - 6:01
 "Wishing Well" - 4:24
 "White Feathers" - 1:51
 "Interview" - 4:00
 "Voodoo" - 2:17
 "Inconspicuous Audiometric" - 1:48
 "Pigeon Chest" - 3:10

Composed by the Black Dog & Black Sifichi, produced by the Black Dog

References

External links
 Unsavoury Products at discogs.com

2002 albums
The Black Dog (band) albums